The 2004–05 Southern Professional Hockey League season was the first season of the Southern Professional Hockey League.  The regular season began October 29, 2004, and ended April 1, 2005, after a 56-game regular season and a six-team playoff.  The Columbus Cottonmouths won the first SPHL championship.

Regular season

Final standings

‡  Commissioner's Cup winners
 Advanced to playoffs

Attendance

President's Cup playoffs

Quarterfinals
Note: game-winning goal scorer indicated in italics

(1) Knoxville Ice Bears and (2) Macon Trax
The Knoxville Ice Bears and the Macon trax get byes for the Quarter Finals round of the playoffs.  The teams will be reseeded for the Simi Finals round.

(3) Jacksonville Barracudas vs. (6) Huntsville Havoc

(4) Fayetteville FireAntz vs. (5) Columbus Cottonmouths

Semifinals
Note: game-winning goal scorer indicated in italics

(1) Knoxville Ice Bears vs. (5) Columbus Cottonmouths

(2) Macon Trax vs. (3) Jacksonville Barracudas

Finals

Awards
The Coach of the Year award was announced on March 21, 2005, followed by the All-Star team on March 22, Goalie of the Year on March 23, Defenseman of the Year on March 24, and MVP and Rookie of the Year on March 25.

All-Star selections

References

Southern Professional Hockey League seasons
South